Pat Mayse Lake is a reservoir in the Prairies and Lakes region of Texas, United States. It is in Lamar County near the towns of Chicota and Powderly. Paris, Texas is the nearest major city.

The lake is managed by the United States Army Corps of Engineers. It is stocked with largemouth bass, white crappie, sunfish, striped bass, channel and flathead catfish, and other common fish species. Nearby hunting areas are also managed for upland game and whitetail deer and are open to the public. The game species present include deer, fox squirrel, gray squirrel, bobwhite quail, morning dove, cottontail rabbit, raccoon, turkey, and fox. Furbearers such as opossum, beaver, mink, skunk, and nutria are also present.

Pat Mayse is the site of the "2 of Us - North Region" fishing tournament held annually in early June.  It is also the location for the annual "Uncle Jesse's Big Bass" tournament.

External links

Tournament info
Hunting info
Recreation info
General history and information

Pat Mayse
Protected areas of Lamar County, Texas
Bodies of water of Lamar County, Texas